Daedalus Project may refer to:

Project Daedalus, a 1973–1978 uncrewed spacecraft project
Daedalus Project (skydiving), a brand of high performance parachutes 
Daedalus Project, research into the psychology and sociology of MMORPGs by Nick Yee

See also
Daedalus (disambiguation)